Exocoetus monocirrhus is a species of fish in the family Exocoetidae.

References 

Animals described in 1846
monocirrhus